Tengiz Zhghenti (15 June 1887 – 24 May 1937) was a Georgian politician who served as the Second Chairman of the Revolutionary Committee of Adjara from 15 November 1921 to 10 January 1922. Born into an impoverished noble family in Guria, Zhghenti was an active member of the Bolsheviks in Georgia. In 1919 he served as the military commissioner of Odessa, and helped fight off revolts by the Musavats in Azerbaijan and Mensheviks in Georgia in the early 1920s. He killed himself on 24 May 1937.

References

1887 births
1937 deaths
Revolutionaries from Georgia (country)
Old Bolsheviks
People from Guria
People of the Russian Revolution
Suicides in Georgia (country)